Mothers' Instinct is a 2018 Belgian psychological thriller film directed by Olivier Masset-Depasse. The story is loosely based on the 2012 novel Behind the Hatred (Derrière la haine) by Barbara Abel. The film was screened as a special presentation at the 2018 Toronto International Film Festival.

It received ten nominations at the 10th Magritte Awards, winning in nine categories, including Best Film and Best Director for Masset-Depasse, holding the record for the most Magritte Awards won by a single film.

Cast
 Veerle Baetens as Alice Brunelle
 Anne Coesens as Céline Geniot
 Mehdi Nebbou as Simon Brunelle
 Arieh Worthalter as Damien Geniot
 Jules Lefebvres as Theo Brunelle
 Luan Adam as Maxime Geniot
 Annick Blancheteau as Jeanne Brunelle

Response

Box office
Mothers' Instinct grossed $122,050 worldwide.

Critical reception

Accolades

References

External links
 
 
 Mothers' Instinct at Box Office Mojo

2018 films
2018 psychological thriller films
Belgian drama films
Belgian thriller films
Films based on Belgian novels
Films based on mystery novels
French drama films
French psychological thriller films
2010s French-language films
Magritte Award winners
2018 drama films
French-language Belgian films
2010s French films